Stanley Benjamin Prusiner (born May 28, 1942) is an American neurologist and biochemist. He is the director of the Institute for Neurodegenerative Diseases at University of California, San Francisco (UCSF). Prusiner discovered prions, a class of infectious self-reproducing pathogens primarily or solely composed of protein. He received the Albert Lasker Award for Basic Medical Research in 1994 and the Nobel Prize in Physiology or Medicine in 1997 for prion research developed by him and his team of experts (D. E. Garfin, D. P. Stites, W. J. Hadlow, C. W. Eklund) beginning in the early 1970s.

Early life, career and research
He was born in Des Moines, Iowa, to Miriam (Spigel) and Lawrence Prusiner, an architect. He spent his childhood in Des Moines and Cincinnati, Ohio, where he attended Walnut Hills High School, where he was known as "the little genius" for his groundbreaking work on a repellent for Boxelder bugs. Prusiner received a Bachelor of Arts degree in chemistry from the University of Pennsylvania and later received his M.D. from the University of Pennsylvania School of Medicine. Prusiner then completed an internship in medicine at the University of California, San Francisco. Later Prusiner moved to the National Institutes of Health, where he studied glutaminases in E. coli in the laboratory of Earl Stadtman.

After three years at NIH, Prusiner returned to UCSF to complete a residency in neurology. Upon completion of the residency in 1974, Prusiner joined the faculty of the UCSF neurology department. Since that time, Prusiner has held various faculty and visiting faculty positions at both UCSF and UC Berkeley.

Since 1999, Prusiner has been director of the Institute for Neurodegenerative Diseases research laboratory at UCSF, working on prion disease, Alzheimer's disease and tauopathies.

Awards and honors
Stanley Prusiner won the Nobel Prize in Physiology or Medicine in 1997 for his work in proposing an explanation for the cause of bovine spongiform encephalopathy ("mad cow disease") and its human equivalent, Creutzfeldt–Jakob disease.  In this work, he coined the term prion, which comes from the words "proteinaceous" and "infectious," in 1982 to refer to a previously undescribed form of infection due to protein misfolding.

Prusiner was elected to the National Academy of Science in 1992 and to its governing council in 2007. He is also an elected member of the American Academy of Arts and Sciences (1993), a Foreign Member of the Royal Society (ForMemRS) in 1997, and the American Philosophical Society (1998), the Serbian Academy of Sciences and Arts (2003), and the Institute of Medicine.

 Potamkin Prize for Alzheimer's Disease Research from the American Academy of Neurology (1991)
 The Richard Lounsbery Award for Extraordinary Scientific Research in Biology and Medicine from the National Academy of Sciences (1993)
 Dickson Prize (1993)
 The Gairdner Foundation International Award (1993)
 The Albert Lasker Award for Basic Medical Research (1994)
 The Paul Ehrlich and Ludwig Darmstaedter Prize from the Federal Republic of Germany (1995)
 The Wolf Prize in Medicine from the Wolf Foundation/State of Israel (1996)
 Grand Prix Charles-Leopold Mayer (1996)
 The Keio International Award for Medical Science (1996)
 Golden Plate Award of the American Academy of Achievement (1996)
 The Louisa Gross Horwitz Prize from Columbia University (1997)
 The Nobel Prize in Physiology or Medicine (1997)
 The Benjamin Franklin Medal from the Franklin Institute (1998)
 Honorary Doctorate from CEU Cardinal Herrera University (2005)
 The National Medal of Science (2010)

See also
 Laura Manuelidis
 Frank Bastian

References

External links
 

1942 births
Living people
Nobel laureates in Physiology or Medicine
American Nobel laureates
Richard-Lounsbery Award laureates
American biochemists
Foreign Members of the Royal Society
Jewish American scientists
Jewish chemists
Jewish physicians
Members of the United States National Academy of Sciences
Members of the Serbian Academy of Sciences and Arts
Prions
University of California, San Francisco faculty
University of California, San Francisco alumni
Perelman School of Medicine at the University of Pennsylvania alumni
Wolf Prize in Medicine laureates
People from Des Moines, Iowa
Recipients of the Albert Lasker Award for Basic Medical Research
Howard Hughes Medical Investigators
Members of the American Philosophical Society
Members of the National Academy of Medicine
Foreign members of the Serbian Academy of Sciences and Arts